This article details the 2011–12 Indonesian Premier Division.

Week 1

References

G